The year 1992 in architecture involved some significant architectural events and new buildings.

Events
At least 7 stave churches in Norway suffer arson attacks, for some of which early black metal musician Varg Vikernes is convicted.

Buildings and structures

Buildings

 October 22: YKK Manufacturing and Engineering Centre in Namerikawa, Toyama, Japan, designed by Roy Fleetwood and Kenji Sugimura, is opened.
 October 31: Kunsthal in Rotterdam, designed by Rem Koolhaas is opened.
 specific date not listed:
 Porto School of Architecture in Portugal, designed by Álvaro Siza Vieira, is completed.
 1000 de La Gauchetière in Montreal, Quebec
 1501 McGill College in Montreal
 1250 René-Lévesque in Montreal, Canada
 The Bank of America Corporate Center in Charlotte, North Carolina, United States is completed.
 Collserola Tower in Barcelona, designed by Norman Foster, is completed.
 Supreme Court of Israel in Jerusalem, designed by Ram Karmi and his sister Ada Karmi-Melamede, is opened.
 Central Plaza in Hong Kong, China is completed.
 Bank of America Plaza in Atlanta, Georgia, United States is completed.
 Construction of the Georgia Dome in Atlanta, Georgia, United States, is completed.
 The GLG Grand in Atlanta, Georgia, United States, is completed.
 SunTrust Plaza in Atlanta, Georgia, United States, is completed.
 The 225 South Sixth tower in Minneapolis, Minnesota, United States, is completed.
 United Overseas Bank Plaza One in Singapore is completed.
 Government offices, Rauma, Finland, designed by Jokela & Kareoja, are built.
 Goetz Collection, Munich, by Herzog & de Meuron.
 The Ark, London, designed by Ralph Erskine, is completed.
 Maitland Robinson Library at Downing College, Cambridge, designed by Quinlan Terry.
 Møller Centre at Churchill College, Cambridge, designed by Henning Larsen, is opened.
 Männistö Church, Kuopio, Finland, designed by Juha Leiviskä, is built.
 Church of St Jan Kanty, Kraków, Poland, designed by Krzysztof Bień, is completed.
 Fountains Abbey Visitor Centre, England, by Edward Cullinan Architects, is completed.
 Punta del Hidalgo Lighthouse on Tenerife is completed (illuminated 1994).
 Central Radio and TV Tower in Beijing, China is completed.
 The Telemax television tower in Hanover, Germany is completed.
 The Zizkov Television Tower in Prague, Czech Republic, is completed.

Awards
AIA Gold Medal – Kevin Roche
Alvar Aalto Medal – Glenn Murcutt
Architecture Firm Award – James Stewart Polshek and Partners.
Carlsberg Architectural Prize – Tadao Ando
European Union Prize for Contemporary Architecture (Mies van der Rohe Prize) – Esteve Bonell and Francesc Rius for Municipal Sports Stadium, Barcelona.
Grand Prix de l'urbanisme – Antoine Grumbach.
Grand prix national de l'architecture – Christian de Portzamparc.
Praemium Imperiale Architecture Laureate – Frank Gehry
Pritzker Prize – Alvaro Siza.
RAIA Gold Medal – Glenn Murcutt.
RIBA Royal Gold Medal – Peter Rice.
Twenty-five Year Award – Salk Institute for Biological Studies.

Births

Deaths
 February 22 – Aarno Ruusuvuori, Finnish architect (born 1925)
 April 27 – Sir James M. Richards, English architectural writer (born 1907)
 March 20 – Lina Bo Bardi, Italian-born Brazilian modernist architect (born 1914)
 June 25 – Sir James Stirling, British architect (born 1926)
 November 10 – Sir John Summerson, English architectural historian (born 1904)

References

 
20th-century architecture